Hardieopterus is a genus of prehistoric eurypterid classified within the family Hardieopteridae. The genus contains four species, all Silurian in age; H. lanarkensis and H. macrophthalmus from Scotland, H. megalops from England and H. myops from the United States.

See also
 List of eurypterids

References

Stylonurina
Silurian arthropods of Europe
Fossils of Great Britain
Silurian arthropods of North America
Silurian eurypterids
Eurypterids of Europe
Eurypterids of North America